Below is a list of United States senators from West Virginia. The state's U.S. senators belong to Classes 1 and 2. West Virginia is currently represented in the Senate by Democrat Joe Manchin (serving since 2010) and Republican Shelley Moore Capito (serving since 2015), making it one of seven states to have a split United States Senate delegation.

List of senators

|- style="height:2em"
| colspan=3 | Vacant
| nowrap | Jun 19, 1863 –Aug 4, 1863
| West Virginia was admitted to the Union on Jun 19, 1863 and elected its first Senators on Aug 4, 1863.
| rowspan=4 | 1
| 
| rowspan=2 | 1
| West Virginia  to the Union on Jun 19, 1863 and elected its first Senators on Aug 4, 1863.
| nowrap | Jun 19, 1863 –Aug 4, 1863
| colspan=3 | Vacant

|- style="height:2em"
! rowspan=3 | 1
| rowspan=3 align=left | Peter G. Van Winkle
| rowspan=2  | Unconditional Unionist
| rowspan=3 nowrap | Aug 4, 1863 –Mar 3, 1869
| rowspan=3 | Elected in 1863.
| Elected in 1863.
| nowrap | Aug 4, 1863 –Mar 3, 1865
|  | Unconditional Unionist
| rowspan=4 align=right | Waitman T. Willey
! rowspan=4 | 1

|- style="height:2em"
| 
| rowspan=3 | 2
| rowspan=3 | Re-elected in 1865.
| rowspan=3 nowrap | Mar 4, 1865 –Mar 3, 1871
| rowspan=3  | Republican

|- style="height:2em"
|  | Republican
| 

|- style="height:2em"
! rowspan=3 | 2
| rowspan=3 align=left | Arthur I. Boreman
| rowspan=3  | Republican
| rowspan=3 nowrap | Mar 4, 1869 –Mar 3, 1875
| rowspan=3 | Elected in 1868 or 1869.Retired.
| rowspan=3 | 2
| 

|- style="height:2em"
| 
| rowspan=7 | 3
| rowspan=7 | Elected in 1871.
| rowspan=10 nowrap | Mar 4, 1871 –Mar 3, 1883
| rowspan=10  | Democratic
| rowspan=10 align=right | Henry G. Davis
! rowspan=10 | 2

|- style="height:2em"
| 

|- style="height:2em"
! 3
| align=left | Allen T. Caperton
|  | Democratic
| nowrap | Mar 4, 1875 –Jul 26, 1876
| Elected in 1874 or 1875.Died.
| rowspan=7 | 3
| 

|- style="height:2em"
| colspan=3 | Vacant
| nowrap | Jul 26, 1876 –Aug 26, 1876
|  

|- style="height:2em"
! 4
| align=left | Samuel Price
|  | Democratic
| nowrap | Aug 26, 1876 –Jan 26, 1877
| Appointed to continue Caperton's term.Lost election to finish Caperton's term.

|- style="height:2em"
| colspan=3 | Vacant
| nowrap | Jan 26, 1877 –Jan 31, 1877
| 

|- style="height:2em"
! rowspan=3 | 5
| rowspan=3 align=left | Frank Hereford
| rowspan=3  | Democratic
| rowspan=3 nowrap | Jan 31, 1877 –Mar 3, 1881
| rowspan=3 | Elected in 1877 to finish Caperton's term.

|- style="height:2em"
| 
| rowspan=3 | 4
| rowspan=3 | Re-elected in 1877.Retired.

|- style="height:2em"
| 

|- style="height:2em"
! rowspan=3 | 6
| rowspan=3 align=left | Johnson N. Camden
| rowspan=3  | Democratic
| rowspan=3 nowrap | Mar 4, 1881 –Mar 3, 1887
| rowspan=3 | Elected in 1880 or 1881.
| rowspan=3 | 4
| 

|- style="height:2em"
| 
| rowspan=3 | 5
| rowspan=3 | Elected in 1883.
| rowspan=5 | Mar 4, 1883 –Jan 11, 1893
| rowspan=5  | Democratic
| rowspan=5 align=right | John E. Kenna
! rowspan=5 | 3

|- style="height:2em"
| 

|- style="height:2em"
! rowspan=8 | 7
| rowspan=8 align=left | Charles J. Faulkner
| rowspan=8  | Democratic
| rowspan=8 | Mar 4, 1887 –Mar 3, 1899
| rowspan=5 | Elected in 1887.
| rowspan=5 | 5
| 

|- style="height:2em"
| 
| rowspan=5 | 6
| rowspan=2 | Re-elected in 1889.Died.

|- style="height:2em"
| 

|- style="height:2em"
|  
| nowrap | Jan 11, 1893 –Jan 25, 1893
| colspan=3 | Vacant

|- style="height:2em"
| rowspan=2 | Elected in 1893 to finish Kenna's term.
| rowspan=2 nowrap | Jan 25, 1893 –Mar 3, 1895
| rowspan=2  | Democratic
| rowspan=2 align=right | Johnson N. Camden
! rowspan=2 | 4

|- style="height:2em"
| rowspan=3 | Re-elected in 1893.Retired.
| rowspan=3 | 6
| 
|- style="height:2em"
| 
| rowspan=3 | 7
| rowspan=3 | Elected in 1895.
| rowspan=8 nowrap | Mar 4, 1895 –Jan 4, 1911
| rowspan=8  | Republican
| rowspan=8 align=right | Stephen B. Elkins
! rowspan=8 | 5

|- style="height:2em"
| 

|- style="height:2em"
! rowspan=9 | 8
| rowspan=9 align=left | Nathan B. Scott
| rowspan=9  | Republican
| rowspan=9 | Mar 4, 1899 –Mar 3, 1911
| rowspan=3 | Elected in 1899.
| rowspan=3 | 7
| 

|- style="height:2em"
| 
| rowspan=3 | 8
| rowspan=3 | Re-elected in 1901.

|- style="height:2em"
| 

|- style="height:2em"
| rowspan=6 | Re-elected in 1905.Lost renomination.
| rowspan=6 | 8
| 

|- style="height:2em"
| 
| rowspan=6 | 9
| rowspan=2 | Re-elected in 1907.Died.

|- style="height:2em"
| 

|- style="height:2em"
|  
| nowrap | Jan 4, 1911 –Jan 9, 1911
| colspan=3 | Vacant

|- style="height:2em"
| Appointed to continue his father's term.
| nowrap | Jan 9, 1911 –Jan 31, 1911
|  | Republican
| align=right | Davis Elkins
! 6

|- style="height:2em"
| rowspan=2 | Elected in 1911 to finish Stephen Elkins' term.Lost re-election.
| rowspan=2 nowrap | Feb 1, 1911 –Mar 3, 1913
| rowspan=2  | Democratic
| rowspan=2 align=right | Clarence W. Watson
! rowspan=2 | 7

|- style="height:2em"
! rowspan=4 | 9
| rowspan=4 align=left | William E. Chilton
| rowspan=4  | Democratic
| rowspan=4 nowrap | Mar 4, 1911 –Mar 3, 1917
| rowspan=4 | Elected in 1911.Lost re-election.
| rowspan=4 | 9
| 

|- style="height:2em"
| 
| rowspan=4 | 10
|  
| nowrap | Mar 4, 1913 –Apr 1, 1913
| colspan=3 | Vacant

|- style="height:2em"
| rowspan=3 | Elected in 1913 but took office late.Retired.
| rowspan=3 nowrap | Apr 1, 1913 –Mar 3, 1919
| rowspan=3  | Republican
| rowspan=3 align=right | Nathan Goff Jr.
! rowspan=3 | 8

|- style="height:2em"
| 

|- style="height:2em"
! rowspan=3 | 10
| rowspan=3 align=left | Howard Sutherland
| rowspan=3  | Republican
| rowspan=3 nowrap | Mar 4, 1917 –Mar 3, 1923
| rowspan=3 | Elected in 1916.Lost re-election.
| rowspan=3 | 10
| 

|- style="height:2em"
| 
| rowspan=3 | 11
| rowspan=3 | Elected in 1918.Retired.
| rowspan=3 nowrap | Mar 4, 1919 –Mar 3, 1925
| rowspan=3  | Republican
| rowspan=3 align=right | Davis Elkins
! rowspan=3 | 9

|- style="height:2em"
| 

|- style="height:2em"
! rowspan=3 | 11
| rowspan=3 align=left | Matthew M. Neely
| rowspan=3  | Democratic
| rowspan=3 nowrap | Mar 4, 1923 –Mar 3, 1929
| rowspan=3 | Elected in 1922.Lost re-election.
| rowspan=3 | 11
| 

|- style="height:2em"
| 
| rowspan=3 | 12
| rowspan=3 | Elected in 1924.Retired.
| rowspan=3 nowrap | Mar 4, 1925 –Mar 3, 1931
| rowspan=3  | Republican
| rowspan=3 align=right | Guy D. Goff
! rowspan=3 | 10

|- style="height:2em"
| 

|- style="height:2em"
! rowspan=3 | 12
| rowspan=3 align=left | Henry D. Hatfield
| rowspan=3  | Republican
| rowspan=3 nowrap | Mar 4, 1929 –Jan 3, 1935
| rowspan=3 | Elected in 1928.Lost re-election.
| rowspan=3 | 12
| 

|- style="height:2em"
| 
| rowspan=4 | 13
| rowspan=4 | Elected in 1930.
| rowspan=7 | Mar 4, 1931 –Jan 12, 1941
| rowspan=7  | Democratic
| rowspan=7 align=right | Matthew M. Neely
! rowspan=7 | 11

|- style="height:2em"
| 

|- style="height:2em"
| colspan=3 | Vacant
| nowrap | Jan 3, 1935 –Jun 19, 1935
| Senator-elect was not yet qualified to serve.
| rowspan=4 | 13
| 

|- style="height:2em"
! rowspan=3 | 13
| rowspan=3 align=left | Rush Holt Sr.
| rowspan=3  | Democratic
| rowspan=3 nowrap | Jan 3, 1935 –Jan 3, 1941
| rowspan=3 | Elected in 1934.Could not take seat until reaching age 30 on Jun 19, 1935.Lost renomination.

|- style="height:2em"
| 
| rowspan=5 | 14
| rowspan=3 | Re-elected in 1936.Resigned.

|- style="height:2em"
| 

|- style="height:2em"
! rowspan=10 | 14
| rowspan=10 align=left | Harley M. Kilgore
| rowspan=10  | Democratic
| rowspan=10 nowrap | Jan 3, 1941 –Feb 28, 1956
| rowspan=5 | Elected in 1940.
| rowspan=5 | 14
| 

|- style="height:2em"
| Appointed to continue Neely's term.Lost election to finish Neely's term.
| nowrap | Jan 13, 1941 –Nov 17, 1942
|  | Democratic
| align=right | Joseph Rosier
! 12

|- style="height:2em"
| Elected in 1942 to finish Neely's term.Retired.
| nowrap | Nov 18, 1942 –Jan 3, 1943
|  | Republican
| align=right | Hugh I. Shott
! 13

|- style="height:2em"
| 
| rowspan=3 | 15
| rowspan=3 | Elected in 1942.Lost re-election.
| rowspan=3 nowrap | Jan 3, 1943 –Jan 3, 1949
| rowspan=3  | Republican
| rowspan=3 align=right | Chapman Revercomb
! rowspan=3 | 14

|- style="height:2em"
| 

|- style="height:2em"
| rowspan=3 | Re-elected in 1946.
| rowspan=3 | 15
| 

|- style="height:2em"
| 
| rowspan=3 | 16
| rowspan=3 | Elected in 1948.
| rowspan=8 | Jan 3, 1949 –Jan 8, 1958
| rowspan=8  | Democratic
| rowspan=8 align=right | Matthew M. Neely
! rowspan=8 | 15

|- style="height:2em"
| 

|- style="height:2em"
| rowspan=2 | Re-elected in 1952.Died.
| rowspan=9 | 16
| 

|- style="height:2em"
| 
| rowspan=9 | 17
| rowspan=5 | Re-elected in 1954.Died.

|- style="height:2em"
| colspan=3 | Vacant
| nowrap | Feb 28, 1956 –Mar 13, 1956
|  

|- style="height:2em"
! 15
| align=left | William Laird III
|  | Democratic
| nowrap | Mar 13, 1956 –Nov 6, 1956
| Appointed to continue Kilgore's term.Retired when his successor was elected.

|- style="height:2em"
! rowspan=5 | 16
| rowspan=5 align=left | Chapman Revercomb
| rowspan=5  | Republican
| rowspan=5 nowrap | Nov 7, 1956 –Jan 3, 1959
| rowspan=5 | Elected in 1956 to finish Kilgore's term.Lost re-election.

|- style="height:2em"
| 

|- style="height:2em"
|  
| nowrap | Jan 8, 1958 –Jan 25, 1958
| colspan=3 | Vacant

|- style="height:2em"
| Appointed to continue Neely's term.Lost election to finish Neely's term.
| nowrap | Jan 25, 1958 –Nov 4, 1958
|  | Republican
| align=right | John D. Hoblitzell Jr.
! 16

|- style="height:2em"
| rowspan=2 | Elected in 1958 to finish Neely's term.
| rowspan=14 nowrap | Nov 5, 1958 –Jan 3, 1985
| rowspan=14  | Democratic
| rowspan=14 align=right | Jennings Randolph
! rowspan=14 | 17

|- style="height:2em"
! rowspan=27 | 17
| rowspan=27 align=left | Robert Byrd
| rowspan=27  | Democratic
| rowspan=27 nowrap | Jan 3, 1959 –Jun 28, 2010
| rowspan=3 | Elected in 1958.
| rowspan=3 | 17
| 

|- style="height:2em"
| 
| rowspan=3 | 18
| rowspan=3 | Re-elected in 1960.

|- style="height:2em"
| 

|- style="height:2em"
| rowspan=3 | Re-elected in 1964.
| rowspan=3 | 18
| 

|- style="height:2em"
| 
| rowspan=3 | 19
| rowspan=3 | Re-elected in 1966.

|- style="height:2em"
| 

|- style="height:2em"
| rowspan=3 | Re-elected in 1970.
| rowspan=3 | 19
| 

|- style="height:2em"
| 
| rowspan=3 | 20
| rowspan=3 | Re-elected in 1972.

|- style="height:2em"
| 

|- style="height:2em"
| rowspan=3 | Re-elected in 1976.
| rowspan=3 | 20
| 

|- style="height:2em"
| 
| rowspan=3 | 21
| rowspan=3 | Re-elected in 1978.Retired.

|- style="height:2em"
| 

|- style="height:2em"
| rowspan=4 | Re-elected in 1982.
| rowspan=4 | 21
| 

|- style="height:2em"
| 
| rowspan=4 | 22
|  
| nowrap | Jan 3, 1985 –Jan 15, 1985
| colspan=3 | Vacant

|- style="height:2em"
| rowspan=3 | Elected in 1984.Seated late to remain Governor of West Virginia.
| rowspan=18 nowrap | Jan 15, 1985 –Jan 3, 2015
| rowspan=18  | Democratic
| rowspan=18 align=right | Jay Rockefeller
! rowspan=18 | 18

|- style="height:2em"
| 

|- style="height:2em"
| rowspan=3 | Re-elected in 1988.
| rowspan=3 | 22
| 

|- style="height:2em"
| 
| rowspan=3 | 23
| rowspan=3 | Re-elected in 1990.

|- style="height:2em"
| 

|- style="height:2em"
| rowspan=3 | Re-elected in 1994.
| rowspan=3 | 23
| 

|- style="height:2em"
| 
| rowspan=3 | 24
| rowspan=3 | Re-elected in 1996.

|- style="height:2em"
| 

|- style="height:2em"
| rowspan=3 | Re-elected in 2000.
| rowspan=3 | 24
| 

|- style="height:2em"
| 
| rowspan=3 | 25
| rowspan=3 | Re-elected in 2002.

|- style="height:2em"
| 

|- style="height:2em"
| rowspan=2 | Re-elected in 2006.Died.
| rowspan=6 | 25
| 

|- style="height:2em"
| 
| rowspan=6 | 26
| rowspan=6 | Re-elected in 2008.Retired.

|- style="height:2em"
| colspan=3 | Vacant
| nowrap | Jun 28, 2010 –Jul 16, 2010
|  

|- style="height:2em"
! 18
| align=left | Carte Goodwin
|  | Democratic
| nowrap | Jul 16, 2010 –Nov 15, 2010
| Appointed to continue Byrd's term.Retired when his successor was elected.

|- style="height:2em"
! rowspan=8 | 19
| rowspan=8 align=left | Joe Manchin
| rowspan=8  | Democratic
| rowspan=8 nowrap | Nov 15, 2010 –Present
| rowspan=2 | Elected in 2010 to finish Byrd's term.

|- style="height:2em"
| 

|- style="height:2em"
| rowspan=3 | Re-elected in 2012.
| rowspan=3 | 26
| 

|- style="height:2em"
| 
| rowspan=3 | 27
| rowspan=3 | Elected in 2014.
| rowspan=6 nowrap | Jan 3, 2015 –Present
| rowspan=6  | Republican
| rowspan=6 align=right | Shelley Moore Capito
! rowspan=6 | 19

|- style="height:2em"
| 

|- style="height:2em"
| rowspan=3 | Re-elected in 2018.
| rowspan=3 | 27
| 

|- style="height:2em"
| 
| rowspan=3 | 28
| rowspan=3 | Re-elected in 2020.

|- style="height:2em"
| 

|- style="height:2em"
| rowspan=2 colspan=5 | To be determined in the 2024 election.
| rowspan=2|28
| 

|- style="height:2em"
| 
| 29
| colspan=5 | To be determined in the 2026 election.

See also

 List of United States representatives from West Virginia
 United States congressional delegations from West Virginia
 Elections in West Virginia

References

 
Senators
West Virginia